I'm Sorry, I'll Read That Again (often abbreviated as ISIRTA) was a BBC radio comedy programme that originated from the 1964 Cambridge University Footlights revue, Cambridge Circus. This is a scripted sketch show. It had a devoted youth following, with the live tapings enjoying very lively audiences, particularly when familiar themes and characters were repeated; a tradition that continued into the spinoff show I'm Sorry I Haven't a Clue.

The show ran for nine series and was first broadcast on 3 April 1964, a pilot programme having been broadcast on 30 December 1963 under the title "Cambridge Circus", on the BBC Home Service (renamed BBC Radio 4 in September 1967). Series 1 comprised three episodes. Subsequent series were broadcast on the BBC Light Programme (renamed BBC Radio 2 in September 1967).  Series 2 (1965) had nine episodes, series 3 (1966) and series 6 through 8 (1968 through 1970) each had thirteen episodes, while series 4 (1966–67) and 5 (1967) both had fourteen episodes.  After a three-year hiatus the ninth, final series was transmitted in November and December 1973, with eight episodes. An hour-long 25th anniversary show was broadcast in 1989, comically introduced as "full frontal radio".

The title of the show derives from a phrase commonly used by BBC Announcers in the age of live radio, following an on-air flub: "I'm sorry, I'll read that again." Basing the show's title on the phrase used to recover from a mistake set the tone for the series as an irreverent and loosely produced comedy show.

I'm Sorry I Haven't a Clue, an unscripted comedy panel game which is a spin-off from ISIRTA, was first produced in 1972 (invented by ISIRTA regular Graeme Garden, who was anxious to develop a comedy format that didn't involve a script deadline each week).

Cast
Tim Brooke-Taylor (later one of the three members of The Goodies). He wrote humorous books on subjects including cricket and golf. He was a member of the cast of the television comedy series At Last the 1948 Show with John Cleese, Graham Chapman and Marty Feldman, and later appeared in Feldman's television comedy series Marty. He acted in many other television sitcoms, and appeared in the 1970s BBC radio sketch show Hello, Cheeky! with John Junkin and Barry Cryer, later translated to ITV.  He also appeared in the 1971 film Willy Wonka & the Chocolate Factory in the uncredited role of the computer scientist.  Brooke-Taylor died in April 2020, aged 79.
John Cleese (later part of Monty Python and star of Fawlty Towers) formed his own production company Video Arts in the 1970s to make business training films, which contained much Python-esque/Basil Fawlty-style humour, and also made films including A Fish Called Wanda and Fierce Creatures. On the 25th anniversary ISIRTA show, he performed his silly walk and sang "The Ferret Song". He appeared in At Last the 1948 Show in 1967 with Tim Brooke-Taylor, Graham Chapman and Marty Feldman, and was co-writer with Graham Chapman of several episodes of the Doctor in the House television comedy series. In later series, Cleese was often absent, due to his appearances in Monty Python; in the sleeve notes to the BBC's re-issues of the shows on cassette, his absences were explained as "[having] ranting commitments elsewhere".
Graeme Garden (also one of the three members of The Goodies). A qualified medical doctor, Garden was co-writer with Bill Oddie of several episodes of the medical comedy Doctor in the House on ITV (appearing in the episode "Doctor on the Box" as a television presenter). He also appeared as Commander Forrest in the Yes Minister television episode "The Death List".  He was a member of I'm Sorry, I'll Read That Again from the start.  At the same time, he was studying medicine in London. Because he did a midwifery medical course in Plymouth, he was unable to be a member of the cast of ISIRTA during the third series, due to the distance between London and Plymouth which made commuting to record the shows impossible. However, Graeme kept sending scripts for the radio show by mail - and rejoined the cast upon his return to his medical studies in London.
David Hatch (who was appointed to executive positions within the BBC, including Controller of BBC Radio 4), as was common in BBC radio at that time, served both as the show's announcer and as a cast member (similar to Douglas Smith's role in Round the Horne; Hatch however did give his roles some characterisation, in contrast to Smith's totally deadpan style). Hatch's announcements were frequently lampooned or interrupted by other cast members. In the 25th Anniversary special, Hatch invited the audience to join them again in 25 years time - ironically, by 2014 Hatch, who died in 2007, was the only cast member to have died.
Jo Kendall (a radio actress in many straight dramas subsequently; also appeared in the radio comedy series The Burkiss Way).  She also guest starred (as the voice of The Queen) in The Goodies 1980 episode "Goodies and Politics". Kendall died in January 2022.
Bill Oddie (also one of the three members of The Goodies). He has written many books, and has been an important spokesman on wildlife and ecological issues since the 1980s. Bill Oddie wrote and performed a daft but well-crafted song in the middle of most ISIRTA programmes. He was co-writer (with Graeme Garden) of several episodes of the Doctor in the House television comedy series.
Humphrey Barclay was the producer of ISIRTA until 1968; from April that year the task was shared by David Hatch and Peter Titherage. In 1973, production was shared by David Hatch with John Cassels (for six episodes) and with Bob Oliver Rogers (for two episodes).
Music for the links and songs was provided by Dave Lee and his band. In keeping with the tradition of the Goons, the band featured at the end of each show after the (brief) sign-off song, however unlike the Goons there was no regular second spot during the show, furthermore rather than a live performance of a jazz standard, the tune at the end was a recording of them playing an up-tempo jazz piano trio number, composed by Lee specifically to act as a signature tune for the show.

Influence
As well as giving rise to The Goodies team, ISIRTA shows the roots of the Monty Python team very clearly, with Cleese, Chapman and Eric Idle all regular script contributors. The show's creator Humphrey Barclay went on to create the TV show Do Not Adjust Your Set, featuring the rest of the Python team, as well as Idle.

ISIRTAs roots can be traced back to classic radio comedies like It's That Man Again and The Goon Show. As with Round the Horne, the cast's adventures would sometimes be episodic with cliff-hanger endings each week as with "The Curse of the Flying Wombat" (3rd series), and "Professor Prune And The Electric Time Trousers" (7th series). Christmas specials normally included a spoof of a traditional pantomime (or several combined). They had few qualms about the use of puns – old, strained or inventive – and included some jokes and catchphrases now considered politically incorrect. Garden's impressions of the rugby league commentator Eddie Waring and the Scottish TV presenter Fyfe Robertson, Oddie's frequent parodies of the game-show host Hughie Green, and Cleese's occasional but manic impressions of Patrick Moore (astronomer and broadcaster) .

As the only woman on the show, Jo Kendall voiced all the female characters (with the exception of Brooke-Taylor's oversexed harridan, Lady Constance de Coverlet) and occasionally extended into having conversations with herself in different voices. (In one episode of the serial "The Curse of the Flying Wombat", not only did Kendall play two characters in the same scene but so did Tim Brooke-Taylor, resulting in a four way conversation between the two actors). Kendall also wrote some of her own material.

The show ended with an unchanging sign-off song, which Bill Oddie performed as "Angus Prune" and was referred to by the announcer as "The Angus Prune Tune". Spoof dramas were billed as Prune Playhouse and many parodies of commercial radio were badged as Radio Prune.

Repeats and spinoffs
Several cast members appeared in the radio comedy panel game I'm Sorry I Haven't a Clue, a spinoff from ISIRTA that has outlived it by decades. Graeme Garden and Tim Brooke-Taylor continued as regulars on the show.

All series of ISIRTA have been rebroadcast on BBC Radio 4 Extra (available on digital television, DAB digital radio and the web), though some episodes (series 8 episode 2, and series 9 episodes 5 & 6) were not transmitted due to potentially offensive content. Listeners in Australia occasionally find ISIRTA in the 5.30am vintage comedy timeslot on ABC Radio National (available on the web to overseas listeners).

The official story of ISIRTA was published in The Clue Bible by Jem Roberts, in 2009.

In 2015, plans were announced for a live "Best Of" homage show, using material by Garden and Oddie reworked by Barnaby Eaton-Jones, Jem Roberts and Dirk Maggs, performed by Hannah Boydell, David Clarke, Barnaby Eaton-Jones, William KV Browne and Ben Perkins  The show was a sell-out success at The Bacon Theatre, Cheltenham in February 2016 and a tour was licensed by Graeme Garden and Bill Oddie to the same company, the Offstage Theatre Group.   In February 2017, it was announced that the British tour would take place later in the year, with guest appearances by Garden, Oddie, Taylor and Jo Kendall. In 2019 four new episodes with the slightly modified title "I'm Sorry I'll Read That Again... Again" were recorded and broadcast on Radio 4 Extra with some original cast including Tim Brooke Taylor, together with newer performers such as Barnaby Eaton-Jones.

Catchphrases

 "I'm sorry, I'll read that again" – a frequent interruption to mock news broadcasts on the show – the line often reads "Here is the news. I'm sorry, I'll read that again: Here are the news."
 "Rhubarb tart?" A delicacy much loved by all the cast members and often used as a bribe during sketches. David Hatch leaves the University of the Air during a Julius Caesar spoof lecture after Bill Oddie's flip remarks, only to be coaxed back with offers of rhubarb tart. It is also Angus Prune's favourite dish. In the "Ali Baba" sketch in the 3rd series, Cleese appears as Omar Khayyam; he remarks to Ali Baba, played by Brooke-Taylor, "Surely you've heard of the Rhubarb Tart of Omar Khayyam?" There were also two "Rhubarb Tart" songs, one sung by Cleese, which he also sang in At Last the 1948 Show, and one sung by Oddie, which became "The Custard Pie Song" in the TV series The Goodies.
 The Tillingbourne Folk and Madrigal Society. A recurring parody of English a cappella folk music (madrigal). The Society performed a range of songs from a medley of football chants through to the never-ending folk song "There was a Ship that put to Sea all in the Month of May." They also presented a version of "House of the Rising Sun", with Graeme Garden singing a fairly straight version of the song and the rest of the group providing highly mannered interjections, such as "tiddly-pom" and "whack-fol-riddle-me-o". Yet, despite the whimsy, it was clear that the cast members were very capable singers.
 "I'm the king rat!" Generally said very over-dramatically by John Cleese, on which the rest of the cast would reply, "Oh, no you're not!" This was later referenced in a Monty Python sketch at a "hospital for over-actors".
 "The Angus Prune Tune". Written by Bill Oddie and performed by Bill Oddie (often with considerable audience involvement), this was the sign-off song for the series. In a retrospective show called I'm Sorry I'll Read That Again, Again broadcast on BBC Radio 4 Extra in March 2013 to celebrate 50 years of ISIRTA, Bill Oddie said that the lyrics which were added later had been written by Humphrey Barclay. The full text runs as follows:
My name is Angus Prune
and I always listen to I'm Sorry I'll Read That Again
(You Don't!)
My name is Angus Prune
and I never miss I'm Sorry I'll Read That Again
(Get Away!)
I sit in my bath
And I have a good laugh
Cause the sig tune is named after me
(Tell us yer name!)
My name is Angus Prune
And this is my tune
It goes I-S-I-R-T-A
I'm Sorry I'll Read That AGAIN!'
 Beethoven's Fifth. The opening bars of the symphony are constantly used in the series, usually in inappropriate settings; their first appearance was in the first sketch of the pilot programme in 1963, and during an Opportunity Knocks spoof in the 3rd series Bill Oddie tries to tap-dance to them in what sound like hob-nailed boots. David Hatch once introduced the cast: "with another of their sallies forth – (GRAMS: 'Da-da-da-dummmmm') – or Beethoven's Fifth –" On another occasion, the pre-show teaser was Beethoven, played by Brooke-Taylor, trying to get Bill Oddie, playing a stereotypically Jewish-sounding music publisher, to market the tune. After hearing the tune, Oddie says: "That's a load of old rubbish!" and then twists the melody to form the opening sig. The closing bars of the final movement of the symphony were used to introduce a 'promenade concert' that featured "There was a Ship that put to Sea all in the Month of May" – Hatch says solemnly in his best BBC voice: "That was the Vienna Philharmonic Orchestra under Wilhelm Furtwängler. Now, while they're getting up ..."
 "The Ferret Song". John Cleese has an obsession with ferrets throughout the show, including his performance of "The Ferret Song". This song begins with the line "I've got a ferret sticking up my nose." The line is repeated, then: "How it got there I can't tell, but now it's there, it hurts like hell and, what is more, it radically affects my sense of smell," – and promptly gets even worse. The song, written by John Cleese and Graham Chapman, was included in The Fairly Incomplete and Rather Badly Illustrated Monty Python Song Book, accompanied by a picture of Cleese with a Terry Jones-shaped ferret up his nose.
 The Silly Roll Call. During many of the longer adventures, the cast engage in the Silly Roll Call, where a series of words (sometimes appropriate to their adventure) are turned into people's names in the vein of an inverted knock-knock joke. The "Jack the Ripper" story involves criminals such as "Mr. and Mrs. Ree ... and their son ... Robby Ree ... and his cousin from the Far East, Ahmed Robby Ree; Mr. and Mrs. Nee, their Swedish son Lars Nee .. and his sister Betty Lars Nee; and Mr. and Mrs. Sittingforimmoralpurposes...and their son...Solly Sittingforimmoralpurposes". In "Jorrocks", the Hunt Ball features appearances by "Lord and Lady V'syouyeahyeahyeah and their daughter Sheila V'syouyeahyeahyeah" as well as "Lord and Lady Umeeroffen and their son Duke Umeeroffen". Even the Ancient Greek world of Oedipus is not sacred – Socrates appears with Knobblyknees, Euripides with Iripadose, Antigone and Uncle-igone, and the treble of Aristophanes, Hoiteetoitees and Afternoonteas (as well as a barrage of rotten fruit). The idea of the Silly Roll Call was revived in I'm Sorry I Haven't a Clue, the final game of the show often being some variant of the "Late Arrivals (at a society ball)" where the same sort of "silly names" would be announced by each of the players in turn.
 The Gibbon. Often when a generic animal is required for a sketch, the team used a gibbon. Every mention of the gibbon usually raises cheers from the audience. This is often expanded to ludicrous lengths, such as a "Gibbon-Fanciers' Club". Edward Gibbon's work Decline and Fall of the Roman Empire is rendered as "Decline and Fall of the Roman Gibbon, by Edward Empire". Stanley Gibbons' Stamp Catalogue became known as Stanley Stamps' Gibbon Catalogue. Later, The Goodies, Brooke-Taylor, Garden, and Oddie had a 1975 Top Ten hit with "Funky Gibbon", which reached #4, and they sang live on Top of the Pops, and the Amnesty International show A Poke in the Eye (With a Sharp Stick), and during The Goodies episode "The Goodies – Almost Live". In The Goodies episode "That Old Black Magic", Graeme Garden acts like an ape to the accompaniment of the Bill Oddie song "Stuff The Gibbon" — and in another Goodies episode, "Radio Goodies", the small boat above their pirate radio submarine is called "The Saucy Gibbon". A track on Soft Machine's Six album entitled "Stanley Stamp's Gibbon Album" is dedicated to Bill Oddie.
 The Aardvark is another animal mentioned frequently, sometimes in connection with puns such as "How to make your aardvark soft again" or gibberish "Welsh" words such as "spotted aardvark pudding".
 The Terrapin, which appears occasionally. In one show, after a particularly macabre John Cleese monologue, Hatch sends him packing, whereupon the rest of the cast defect with Cleese and form Radio Terrapin in competition to Radio Prune. In another show, Bill performs "The Terrapin Song", and on another show, Hatch announces a terrapin joke, as follows: (Garden) "Who was that Terrapin I saw you with last night?" (Brooke-Taylor) "That was no terrapin, that was our old school mistress – she tortoise (taught us)."
 Bill Oddie's accent. Having a Birmingham accent (although born in Rochdale in Lancashire, he grew up in Birmingham) made Oddie the butt of many jokes, as well as leading him naturally towards many roles in sketches where someone was required to speak incomprehensibly. He got his own back in the "Lawrence Of Arabia On Ice" sketch, when he appeared as Nanook of the North, complete with a plethora of cod-Lancastrian patois ("ee bah goom", "black puddings", "ecky thump", etc.) This became the basis for an episode of The Goodies where "Ecky Thump" was a secret Lancastrian martial art, the episode parodying the then-popular TV show Kung Fu.
 The Old Jokes Home. The old jokes, of which there were many (see script below) were sometimes sent to the Old Jokes Home.
 'Spot'. References to "a spot of brandy", "my favourite spot", etc., were usually followed by a canine yelp from Bill Oddie, attributed to "Spot the Dog". Spot became an audience favourite, and made at least one appearance in each episode.
 OBE. Characters often have OBE added to the end of their name. It is also added to places, objects and names, as well as an interruption, e.g. in "The Angus Prune (OBE) Song". The cast occasionally ask for one ("Thank you ma'am, I'll take the OBE if it's offered") or decline one that's been offered ("No thanks, I'm trying to give them up"). On one occasion, Hatch introduced the team as "Tim Brooke-Taylor, O.B.E., John Cleese, O.B.E., Graeme Garden, O.B.E., David Hatch, O.B.E., Jo Kendall, O.B.E., and Bill Oddie, O.D.D.I.E." On another occasion, in a send-up of the Honours List, Hatch announces that a particular person has been made an earl, and also has been awarded the OBE; he therefore becomes an earlobe (this joke was also used in The Goodies series seven episode "Royal Command").
 David Hatch was appointed a CBE in 1994 and was knighted in 2003, Bill Oddie was awarded the OBE also in 2003, Tim Brooke-Taylor and Graeme Garden were appointed OBE in 2011, but John Cleese declined a CBE in 1996. Jo Kendall did not receive any honour.

Episode and sketch titles
The episode titles (for shows from series 3 onwards) are unofficial and mostly come from the last sketch in each episode, which usually took the form of a short play. Figures in parentheses after each title are the Series and Episode numbers, where known.  For example, '(S9E7)' refers to Series 9 Episode 7.

Regular characters of the radio show
The  Director General of the BBC
 played by John Cleese. Continually sends memos to the ISIRTA team with the most ridiculous requests. One week, he decides that "Radio Prune" will become a music channel, a rival to Radio 1. His reason is "We at the BBC may be very, very silly, but we can write letters". He is constantly offended by the contents of the show.
North American Continuity Man
 is a parody of Hughie Green usually played by Oddie, although on one occasion, in the 3rd series, he is voiced by Garden. His catchphrases include "Thank-you, Thank-you" and "Wasn't that just great?" Invariably, when he hands over to Kendall for details of the Prune Play of the Week, she refers to him by another personality's name – Simon (Dee), Jimmy (Young, or possibly Savile), David (Frost), or Eamonn (Andrews). On one occasion, after Kendall announces the title of the Prune Play of the Week Jorrocks: The Memoirs of a Fox-Hunting Man (or a man-hunting fox....), by Stanley Stamps, author of Stanley Stamps' Gibbon catalogue, Bill/Hughie says to the audience, "So will you please put your hands together ... and pray ...."
Angus Prune
 is a character adopted by Bill Oddie to sing the playoff.
Grimbling
A Bill Oddie character, Grimbling is a "dirty old man" who often appears as a groundsman, butler, or some similar profession. Due to the limitations of an audio-only medium, the true nature of Grimbling is never revealed, but he is greeted with universal revulsion by all bar the audience. He memorably introduces himself in the 25th anniversary episode "I am Grimbling, but don't worry, I'll clean it up later." In the same episode, Cleese asks him "Aren't you a little past it, old man?" with the response, "No, I'm a little dirty old man". In the "Robin Hood" sketch in the 3rd series, Grimbling is in the employ of the Sheriff of Nottingham (Garden), who tells him, "You have done well, Grimbling; take this tennis racquet for your services".
Lady Constance de Coverlet
 is a ridiculous female character who was played by Tim Brooke-Taylor. Once the character had become more established, Lady Constance was usually introduced by a statement along the lines of "what is that coming towards us? – It's huge – It's a rhinoceros!" – "No, it's me!!!"  and this was often accompanied by a rousing rendition of "Happy Days Are Here Again", and a thunderous reception from the audience. Her size is legendary; in the "Henry VIII" sketch, Katharine of Aragon and Lady Constance (masquerading as Anne of Cleavage) fight a duel to decide who is to be Queen.  Brooke-Taylor introduces her in the style of a boxing MC: "..and in the blue corner, at 15 hundredweight, your own, your very own – and there's enough to go round – twice -...".  In the "Dentisti" sketch, a parody on the 1960s TV series Daktari, Lady Constance plays (appropriately) an elephant; and in "Jack The Ripper", Lady Constance is invited to: "please, sit down anywhere ... or in your case, everywhere". In the "Radio Prune Greek Tragedy" sketch, she plays the mother of Oedipus Rex – according to the Oracle, she was hoping for a dog – and  she tells Oedipus: "Now let me get on with my housework, I've got a little behind .." (pause for the double-entendre to register) ".. oh all right, I've got a colossal behind!!"  In the "Colditz" sketch, the lads' escape route is through the plug hole of her bath, and Bill Oddie exclaims "She's like a ruddy great iceberg: one eighth above the water, 76 eighths below!". She also in her own way is a bit of a nymphomaniac – she's described in the 25th anniversary show version of "Jack The Ripper" as a steaming volcano of eroticism – and there are frequent references to unfulfilled sexual desire: in the "3.17 to Cleethorpes" sketch, she and the other players in the drama are adrift on a raft in the ocean; Lady Constance offers to take all her clothes off and use them for a sail, and when Hatch says, "Yes, and then what?", Lady Constance replies, "Well, that's rather up to you ...."
Mr Arnold Totteridge
Another recurring character, Arnold Totteridge (played by Garden) is a doddering old man who gets lost in the middle of his sentences. He invariably begins with: "How do you do, do you do, do you do...do you?" and after rambling incoherently for a few minutes returns to where he started. In the 25th anniversary episode, he has been appointed "The Dynamic new-de-oo-do-de-oo-do-de-oo Head of Radio-do-do-de-do Comedy"
John and Mary
 John Cleese and Jo Kendall frequently performed poignant – almost romantic – dialogues as the respectable but dysfunctional couple "John and Mary", a forerunner of the relationship between Basil and Sybil in Fawlty Towers. They bear a passing resemblance to Fiona and Charles of Round the Horne.
Masher Wilkins
A kind-hearted simpleton (played by John Cleese), who often appears as an unlikely villain or henchman. He is prone to malapropisms: "I've been trailing you through this impenetrable ferret-- I mean 'forest'" - but these are often the intro to clever running jokes - in this case the line continues: "Oh no, not ferret, I mean stoat". "Stoat?"  "Yes, 'stoatally impenetrable". At some point, a female character would often call out "Oh, Masher, Masher!" - followed by a chorus of "All fall down!" by the remaining cast. In one show, the topic on The Money Programme is fiscal policy and other matters monetary, and Masher asks some very abstruse questions about the Bank of England and its role in the economy. His last question, however is: 'An' wot's the combination o' de safe: oooh wot a giveaway!!'

Prune Plays
Writers and cast in order of appearance:

Robin Hood
 Written by Graeme Garden and John Cleese
 Story narration – sung by David Hatch
 'Curtain' – Tim Brooke-Taylor
 Maid Marion – Jo Kendall
 Friar Tuck – Bill Oddie
 Robin Hood – Tim Brooke-Taylor
 Alan 'a Gabriel – Graeme Garden
 Will Scarlet – David Hatch
 Little John – John Cleese
 Sir Angus of the Prune – John Cleese
 Grimbling (the Bailiff) – Bill Oddie
 Sheriff of Nottingham – Graeme Garden
 Master of Ceremonies for the 'Archery Competition' – John Cleese
 Deputy Sheriff – Graeme Garden

The Curse of the Flying Wombat
 Written by Graeme Garden and Bill Oddie
 'King Lear' – John Cleese
 Tim Brown-Windsor – Tim Brooke-Taylor
 Mr. Hatch – David Hatch
 Lady Fiona Rabbit-Vacuum (Jim-Lad) – Jo Kendall
 Captain Cleese – John Cleese
 'Lookout' – Bill Oddie
 Casey O'Sullivan – Bill Oddie
 Masher Wilkins – John Cleese
 Maisie Robinson (the International Temptress) – Jo Kendall
 Grimbling (Butler to Tim's Aunt) – Bill Oddie
 Lady Constance de Coverlet – Tim Brooke-Taylor
 "Hurricane" Flossie (Lady Constance's identical twin sister) – Tim Brooke-Taylor
 Slave-girl trader – Bill Oddie
 Colonel Clutch-Featheringhaugh – David Hatch
 Nosebone (the Great White Hunter) – Bill Oddie
 Wong (the Supply-keeper) – Tim Brooke-Taylor
 Wong Tu (his brother) – John Cleese
 'Armand' – Bill Oddie

ISIRTA songs

Comedy songs replaced traditional songs during episodes.

Notes
ISIRTA is referenced in The Goodiess episode Chubbie Chumps, where the initials are printed on the wall in chalk.

"Spot the dog" is referenced in The Goodiess episode Camelot as the royal dog "Spot", where it received an immediate cheer.

In the computer game Zork: Grand Inquisitor, there is a magic spell called Kendall, found just before a reference to a magic plane shared with people who own ferrets.

References

Sources
 I'm Sorry, I'll Read That Again Episode Guide (Ben Newsam)
 I'm Sorry, I'll Read That Again Episode Guide (OTR Today, archived)
 I'm Sorry, I'll Read That Again Episode Guide (Titles & Air Dates)
 I'm Sorry, I'll Read That Again Episode Guide (Everything2)
 Roberts, Jem. The CLUE Bible. 2009. (Includes a large section on ISIRTA as well)

External links
 I'm Sorry, I'll Read That Again — British Comedy website
 I'm Sorry, I'll Read That Again — Trash Fiction website
 Global British Comedy Collective — episode guides for ISIRTA and other radio comedy
 Detailed information on I'm Sorry, I'll Read That Again
 I'm Sorry, I'll Read That Again — mentioned in the article "The History of the BBC" at the BBC website
 Detailed information on I'm Sorry, I'll Read That Again
 The Goodies Illustrated Guide; Cambridge Circus and I'm Sorry, I'll Read That Again (details of related sound recordings)

1964 radio programme debuts
 
BBC Radio comedy programmes
BBC Light Programme programmes
BBC Home Service programmes
BBC Radio 2 programmes
BBC Radio 4 Extra programmes